China Aoyuan Group Limited or Aoyuan is a property developer headquartered in Guangzhou, Guangdong, China. It is engaged in the property development, leasing and hotel operations in Mainland China. It develops real estate properties in Chongqing, Shenyang, Yulin, Jiangxi, Qingyuan and Guangzhou.

Aoyuan's major shareholder, "Ace Rise Profits Limited", was incorporated in British Virgin Islands.

On January 21, 2022, Fitch Ratings downgraded China Aoyuan Group Ltd. to ‘Restricted Default’ after their announcement that it won’t make payments on a set of dollar bonds.

Subsidiaries
 Guangzhou Aoyu (53.96%)

References

External links
 

Companies listed on the Hong Kong Stock Exchange
Offshore companies of the Cayman Islands
Companies based in Guangzhou
Real estate companies established in 1996
Real estate companies of China
Civilian-run enterprises of China